Tha Triflin' Album is the third studio album by West Coast hip hop artist King Tee. It was released on January 26, 1993 via Capitol Records. Recording sessions took place in 1992 in California. Production was handled by nine record producers, including DJ Pooh, DJ Aladdin, Bobcat, Marley Marl, Tha Alkaholiks, Broadway, SLJ, Mr. Woody, and King T himself. It also features guest appearances from Ice Cube, Deadly Threat, Nefretitti, Mad Kap, and Tha Alkaholiks. The album spawned two singles: "Got It Bad Y'all" and "Black Togetha Again". Both singles were later included on King Tee's greatest hits compilation Ruff Rhymes: Greatest Hits Collection. The album peaked at number 95 on the US Billboard 200 and number 17 on the Top R&B/Hip-Hop Albums. The success of this album is quite significant as it allowed King Tee's protégés, Tha Alkaholiks, to gain a following. It also provided a foundation for King Tee's Likwit Crew.

Track listing

Album singles

Charts

References

External links

1993 albums
King Tee albums
Capitol Records albums
Albums produced by DJ Pooh
Albums produced by DJ Aladdin
Albums produced by Marley Marl